Tribalistas is the debut album by Brazilian musical trio Tribalistas, consisting of Marisa Monte, Arnaldo Antunes and Carlinhos Brown.

The 13-track album was released worldwide in 2002. The album sold over a million copies in Brazil alone, despite the group never performing any song on TV or giving any radio interviews. The album also achieved considerable success in Europe; it was the best-selling album of the year in Portugal and it went triple platinum in Italy and double platinum in Spain. The album also charted in Switzerland, Sweden, Netherlands, Germany, France, among other countries.

The album received five Latin Grammy Music Award nomination in 2003 (winning Best Brazilian Contemporary Pop Album), in addition to a BBC Awards for World Music nomination in 2004.

The album spawned four hit singles in Brazil:
"Já Sei Namorar", included on the video game franchise FIFA Football 2004
"Velha Infância", played on the soap opera Mulheres Apaixonadas
"Passe em Casa", co-written and performed with Margareth Menezes
"É Você", played on the soap opera Da Cor do Pecado

The album was such a success that a fifth song on the album, "Mary Cristo", also received heavy radio airplay in Brazil around Christmas 2003. "Já Sei Namorar" achieved some chart success in some European territories.

According to ABPD, the album was one of the 20 best-sold albums in Brazil in 2003.

A DVD release featuring the 'making of' and all the tracks on the album was also released internationally.

Brazilian artist Vik Muniz collaborated with the group to design the CD's cover in his signature style. The cover depicts all three of the group's members, drawn in miniature with chocolate as the main medium.

Track listing

Charts

Year-end charts

Certifications

See also
List of best-selling Latin albums

References

2002 debut albums
Tribalistas albums
Latin Grammy Award for Best Portuguese Language Contemporary Pop Album